This article includes the world record progression for the 4×100 metres medley relay, and it shows the chronological history of world record times in that competitive swimming event. The 4×100 metres medley relay is a medley race in which each of four swimmers on a team swims a 100-metre leg of the relay, each swimming a different stroke, in the following sequence:
 Backstroke (this can only be the first stroke, due to the necessity of starting this leg in the pool rather than by diving in);
 Breaststroke;
 Butterfly;
 Freestyle ("freestyle" means any stroke other than backstroke, breaststroke or butterfly – most swimmers use the front crawl).

Swimming world records are recognized by and maintained by FINA ("Fédération Internationale de Natation"), the international competitive swimming and aquatics federation that oversees the sport in international competition.  World records in the medley relay event were first recognized by FINA in 1953.  The long course (50-metre pool) world records are historically older than the short-course (25-metre pool) records.  FINA amended its regulations governing the recognition of world records in 1956; specifically, FINA mandated that only record times that were contested in 50-metre (or 55-yard) pools were eligible for recognition after that time.  The short-course world records have been separately recognized since 1991. On July 25, 2013 FINA Technical Swimming Congress voted to allow world records in the long course mixed 400 free relay and mixed 400 medley relay, as well as in six events in short course meters: the mixed 200 medley and 200 free relays, as well as the men's and women's 200 free relays and the men's and women's 200 medley relays. In October 2013 FINA decided to establish "standards" before something can be recognized as the first world record in these events. But later on March 13, 2014 FINA has officially ratified the eight world records set by Indiana University swimmers at the IU Relay Rally held on September 26, 2013 in Bloomington.

It is possible to set an individual world record in the 100 metres backstroke by swimming the backstroke first leg of the 4×100-metre medley relay, except in the mixed relay.  Swimming the other three legs of the medley relay cannot qualify as world records as FINA criteria require a "static start" for world record recognition – swimming relay exchanges are characterized as "dynamic".

The first Olympics at which the 4×100 metres medley relay event was contested was the 1960 Summer Olympics in Rome.

Men

Long course

Short course

Women

Long course

Short course

Mixed 

FINA recognizes only long-course world records for mixed relays in this event.

All-time top 10 by country

Men long course
Correct as of June 2022

Men short course
Correct as of December 2022

Women long course
Correct as of December 2021

Women short course
Correct as of December 2022

Mixed long course
Correct as of July 2021

All-time top 25

Men long course
Correct as of August 2022

Men short course
Correct as of December 2022

Women long course
Correct as of October 2022

Women short course
Correct as of December 2022.

Mixed long course
Correct as of August 2022

Mixed short course
Correct as of December 2021

References

Medley relay 4x100 metres
4 × 100 metre medley relay